Hubert Le Loup de Beaulieu, often written Beaulieu-Leloup, ( ? — Forte, Gulf of Bengal, 1 March 1799) was a French East India Company and later Navy officer. He was a cousin to Louis Garneray.

Career

Early life 
He served as second ensign on the East Indiaman Comte de Provence from 1763 to 1764, and as first enseign on the chartered corvette Sage armed for Mauritius on 1 May 1766.

In 1776, he commanded the merchantman Carnate for a journey from Indian to China.

Sercey's squadron 
In 1796, Beaulieu-Leloup served in the Navy in Rochefort with the rank of Commander. He commanded the frigate Forte in Sercey's squadron.

In September 1797, Sercey had him relieved of his command and he was replaced by Captain Ravenel, but reinstated on the insistence of Mauritius governor Malartic, who caved in to pressure from the Colonial Assembly and sent Prudente and Forte to engage in independent commerce raiding off Bengal, disturbing Sercey's plans. Sercey was furious, and wrote to the Ministry of the Navy:

On 24 February 1799, Forte engaged the East Indiaman Osterley. After the battle, Beaulieu-Leloup, deeming the fire from Forte to strike too low, ordered her guns raised by diminishing their quoins by 2.7 cm.

Battle with HMS Sybille 

In the evening of 27 February 1799, she captured the East Indiamen Endeavour and Lord Mornington; unbeknownst to Beaulieu-Leloup, the flashes of the battle were spotted by the 38-gun HMS Sybille, under Captain Edward Cooke, which closed in to investigate. She was spotted by the officers of Forte and identified as a British frigate, but Beaulieu-Leloup insisted that she was another East Indiaman and sent his crew to sleep for the night. It was only when Sybilles intent to intercept became evident that Beaulieu-Leloup called to battle stations; even then, he closed in and ordered a restrained attack, firing his guns one by one to test his opponent.

Cooke reserved his fire and manoeuvered into a raking position before delivering a broadside into the stern of Forte.  In the damage, confusion and smoke caused by Sybilles fire, Forte began to mistakenly fire her starboard battery at one of her own prizes, leaving Sybille free to come about and deliver a second raking broadside from her other battery. The two frigates then began trading broadsides at close range, mortally wounding Cooke at 1:30; ten minutes later, Beaulieu-Leloup was killed by a cannonball.

After Beaulieu-Leloup's death, command of Forte passed to Lieutenant Vigoureux, who was killed himself at 2:00. Lieutenant Luco took over and attempted to manoeuver Forte, but her entire rigging collapsed, putting an end to her resistance. Sybille hailed to inquire whether Forte had struck, and ceased fire when this was confirmed. The next morning, Sybille hoisted a French flag to deceive the prize crew on Endeavour and Lord Mornington and recapture the ships, but the ruse was foiled and the two East Indiamen escaped.

Notes and references

Notes

References

Bibliography 
  
  
  
 
 

 Fonds Marine. Campagnes (opérations ; divisions et stations navales ; missions diverses). Inventaire de la sous-série Marine BB4. Tome premier : BB4 1 à 482 (1790-1826) 
Gilbert Buti, Philippe Hrodej (dir.), Dictionnaire des corsaires et pirates, CNRS éditions, 2013

1759 births
1799 deaths
French Navy officers
French military personnel of the French Revolutionary Wars
French military personnel killed in action